The 2022 SRX race at Pensacola  was a Superstar Racing Experience race that was held on June 18, 2022. It was contested over 75 laps on the  oval. It was the 1st race of the 2022 SRX Series season. Hélio Castroneves held off local-star Bubba Pollard to claim his first SRX Series victory.

Entry list

Heat races 
The heat races were held at 8:00 PM EST. The lineups for the heat were determined by random selection. Following the 1st heat, the field is inverted for the 2nd heat. Points are awarded for each position, and the points set the field.

Heat Race 1

Heat Race 2

Starting Lineup

Race results

Main event

Championship standings after the race
Drivers' Championship standings
 
 Note: Only the top five positions are included for standings.

References 

SRX Pensacola round
SRX Pensacola round
2022 SRX